The Port Washington Branch is an electrified two-track rail line and service owned and operated by the Long Island Rail Road in the U.S. state of New York. It branches north from the Main Line at the former Winfield Junction station, just east of the Woodside station in the New York City borough of Queens, and runs roughly parallel to Northern Boulevard past Mets-Willets Point (Citi Field), Flushing, Murray Hill, Broadway, Auburndale, Bayside, Douglaston, Little Neck, and then crosses into Nassau County for stops in Great Neck, Manhasset, and Plandome before terminating at Port Washington.

The Port Washington Branch is the only LIRR branch to not serve Jamaica, a major LIRR transportation hub, as it branches off the Main Line several miles northwest of Jamaica at Winfield Junction.

Route description

The line has two tracks from Woodside to Great Neck and one track from east of Great Neck past Manhasset and Plandome stations to Port Washington. This often causes slight delays during two-way rush hour operations. A second track cannot be added through Manhasset and Plandome due to the proximity of businesses to the narrow right-of-way in Manhasset, and the fact that the Manhasset Viaduct, which carries the line between Great Neck and Manhasset, has only one track.

To reduce delays on the heavily used line, most peak-hour trains are either local between Manhattan and Great Neck (making all stops) or express between Manhattan and Port Washington (making stops only at Bayside, Great Neck, Manhasset, Plandome station, and Port Washington, although several trains run nonstop between city terminals and Great Neck). A mix of local and express peak-hour trains go west on weekday mornings.

Extra service is offered during the U.S. Open tennis tournament and for New York Mets home games, both of which are held in Flushing Meadows–Corona Park. These trains stop at a special Mets–Willets Point station between Woodside and Flushing Main Street.

The route also runs along a high train trestle over the marshes at the southern end of Manhasset Bay. Scenes from the Hearst-produced silent film serial "The Perils of Pauline" are said to have been shot on the trestle.

There is only one grade crossing, Little Neck Parkway at Little Neck Station.

History

19th century 
The Port Washington Branch was built by the Flushing Railroad, in 1854 from Hunters Point in Long Island City to Flushing, before the LIRR opened its line to Long Island City. It was the first non-LIRR line on Long Island. The company was reorganized in 1859 as the New York and Flushing Railroad, and established a subsidiary known as the North Shore Railroad to extend the line from Flushing to Great Neck in 1866.

Originally intending to run further east to Roslyn, Oyster Bay, and even Huntington, the NY&F's plans were thwarted by the LIRR who reached those destination first, as well as poor service and competition with the 1868-established Flushing and North Side Railroad. In 1869, the New York State Legislature authorized the Flushing and North Side to buy the New York and Flushing east of the LIRR crossing at Winfield Station, while the segment between Hunters Point and Winfield was acquired by the South Side Railroad of Long Island until it was abandoned for passenger service east of what was to become the former Laurel Hill Station in 1875. Part of the right-of-way ran through what is today the Mount Zion Jewish Cemetery in Maspeth.

By 1874, all branches of the Flushing and North Side Railroad, including the Main Line to Great Neck were incorporated into the Flushing, North Shore and Central Railroad, which included the Central Railroad of Long Island. Two years later, it would become part of the Long Island Rail Road, which closed the line east of Flushing in 1881 and reopened it a year later as subsidiary known as the Long Island City and Flushing Railroad. The LIC&F was merged with the LIRR on April 2, 1889.

Despite a failed attempt to extend the line from Great Neck to Roslyn in 1882, wealthy Port Washington residents persuaded the LIRR to bring the terminus to their hometown in 1895. This required the construction of the Manhasset Viaduct over the marshes at the southern end of Manhasset Bay, which was authorized by an LIRR subsidiary called the Great Neck and Port Washington Railroad (GN&PW). According to Manhasset's website, "in 1897, a contract was given to the Carnegie Steel Company and a subsidiary, the King Iron Company, undertook the job of constructing the bridge." The trestle bridge cost about $60,000, and the first train to cross it was on June 23, 1898. The GN&PW was disestablished as a subsidiary in 1902, and that segment simply became part of the Port Washington Branch.

20th century 
Two other early 20th-century stations built on the Port Washington Branch were in Auburndale (1901) and Plandome (1909). The branch was electrified from the main line to Winfield Junction by June 23, 1910, to Whitestone Junction onto the Whitestone Branch to Whitestone Landing Station by October 22, 1912, and to its terminus in Port Washington by October 21, 1913. In 1910, the Public Service Commission approved the LIRR's application to eliminate grade crossings along the line. These projects were prerequisites for the extension of the line's second track to Great Neck and Whitestone and the electrification of the line.

Grade crossing elimination projects took place during the 1910s and 1920s in Queens and Nassau County. These grade elimination projects included unique station reconstruction in places such as Murray Hill which had a station house built over the tracks and Great Neck which had an elaborate plaza built around it. In 1929, the station at Winfield Junction was eliminated, making Woodside Station the transfer point between Main Line and Port Washington Branch trains.

Despite the elimination of the Whitestone Branch in 1932, as well as Flushing Bridge Street station, Flushing station kept the name "Flushing-Main Street Station." A new station was built just in time for the 1939 New York World's Fair then reused for the United Nations, and then the 1964 New York World's Fair and simultaneously Shea Stadium, for which it would be renamed in 1966. This was the last station to be built on the line. By 1985, when Elmhurst station closed, Shea Stadium station would also become the westernmost station on the Port Washington Branch before the junction with the Main Line.

In January 1987, the station building at the Plandome station was burned to the ground by vandals. Following the fire, the station building was rebuilt as a more modern version of the original.

21st century 
In conjunction with the East Side Access project, the MTA is working on two readiness projects that will increase capacity on the Port Washington Branch. The pocket track east of Great Neck station, located between the station and where the line becomes single-tracked, is being extended eastward by  so it can store two trainsets. The construction of the pocket track was originally scheduled for completion in December 2018 at a total cost of $45.2 million. Additionally, the Port Washington Yard, next to Port Washington station, was planned to be expanded to store two more ten-car trains. , construction was scheduled to begin in late 2020 or early 2021 at a cost of $500,000. However, this project met significant community opposition, primarily because of proposed reduction of parking spaces near the station. , the MTA has not come to an agreement with the Town of North Hempstead, resulting in the project being postponed indefinitely.

Alongside these construction projects, a new bridge was built at Colonial Road near Great Neck station; it opened in May 2016 and replaced a 114-year-old span.

Stations

References

External links

MTA Long Island Rail Road
Port Washington Branch Stations (Bob Andersen's Unofficial LIRR History Website)
NYCSubway.org: Port Washington Branch
Forgotten New York:
Pride in Port (The Jekyll & Hyde Branch of the Long Island Railroad: Part One)
Pride in Port (The Jekyll & Hyde Branch of the Long Island Railroad: Part Two)
Port Washington Branch (The LIRR Today)

Long Island Rail Road branches
Transportation in Queens, New York
Transportation in Nassau County, New York